Cătălin Nicolae Liță (born 23 March 1975) is a Romanian former footballer who played as a midfielder.

Honours
Național București
Cupa României runner-up: 1996–97 
Steaua București
Divizia A: 2000–01
Supercupa României: 2001 
MTK Budapest
Nemzeti Bajnokság I: 2002–03

References

1975 births
Living people
Romanian footballers
Romania under-21 international footballers
Association football midfielders
Liga I players
Nemzeti Bajnokság I players
Azerbaijan Premier League players
FC Progresul București players
FC Petrolul Ploiești players
FC Steaua București players
MTK Budapest FC players
Khazar Lankaran FK players
Apollon Limassol FC players
Romanian expatriate footballers
Expatriate footballers in Hungary
Expatriate sportspeople in Hungary
Romanian expatriates in Hungary
Romanian expatriate sportspeople in Hungary
Expatriate footballers in Cyprus
Expatriate sportspeople in Cyprus
Romanian expatriates in Cyprus
Romanian expatriate sportspeople in Cyprus
Expatriate footballers in Azerbaijan
Expatriate sportspeople in Azerbaijan
Romanian expatriate sportspeople in Azerbaijan
Footballers from Bucharest